Animal Rebellion is an animal and climate justice movement with the stated aim of compelling government action towards a plant-based food system. Their justification for the introduction of such a system is the impact of animal agriculture on climate change, species extinction and ecosystem breakdown. It has around 100 organisers and was founded in London in June 2019 by 12 people, including Daniel Kidby, Dora Hargitai, and Alex Lockwood of the University of Sunderland.

Animal Rebellion use civil disobedience methods that has resulted in its members being arrested. These include graffiti, destruction of property, blockading and preventing food distribution, trespassing onto livestock industry premises, and blockading streets. The movement states on its website that it is nonviolent and focuses its actions on systems, not individuals.

Protests

2019 
From 7 October 2019 to 19 October, Animal Rebellion organised a wave of civil disobedience in London and Berlin, in parallel to Extinction Rebellion protests. Animal Rebellion protested in front of the UK Department for Environment, Food and Rural Affairs (Defra) and the German Ministry of Food and Agriculture, at Smithfield meat market, the largest UK meat market, and Billingsgate Fish Market, and at an abattoir in Farnborough, Hampshire, leading to several dozen arrests for obstruction of traffic and "obstruction or disruption of a person engaged in lawful activity". They reported that the abattoir protest was to highlight the role the farming industry plays in the climate crisis, as well as animal welfare issues and the conditions for abattoir workers.

2020 
In 2020, Animal Rebellion staged protests in the UK, Ireland and the Czech Republic in September. In London, they vandalised the Trafalgar Square fountain by dying the water red, resulting in two arrests and a bill for the council to clean the water. In October, Animal Rebellion protested in Berlin (Germany) and Auckland (New Zealand).

2021 

Animal Rebellion protesters blocked the entrance of a Tnuva dairy logistics centre in Petah Tikva, Israel, in February 2021. Similarly, Animal Rebellion blocked the entrances of four McDonald's UK distribution centres in May 2021, demanding the fast-food chain go entirely plant-based by 2025. An Animal Rebellion spokesperson said that what others call sustainable meat is insufficient to mitigate the climate crisis. In July 2021, the group blocked the entrance to OSI Food Solutions, in Scunthorpe. They incorrectly claimed that the factory is the "only UK factory that makes McDonald’s burgers." This is despite the fact that McDonalds burgers are made in multiple factories across the UK with separate regional distribution for Scotland and Northern Ireland. Like the protest in May, they demanded the chain change their menu to entirely plant-based food by 2025.
 On 28 August 2021, they coordinated a protest with Camp Beagle at Smithfield Market in London. During that month they also held a 'McSitin' at Leicester Square, dyed the fountain in front of Buckingham Palace red and blocked the trucks of Arla's biggest UK dairy processing plant which is in Aylesbury.

In October 2021, protesters climbed the Home Office building.

2022 

On 2 June 2022, protesters disrupted the trooping the colour parade, running into the Mall and throwing themselves in front of the procession. Two days later, six female protesters ran onto the course of the Epsom Derby horse race before its start. The action was on the anniversary of Emily Davison's famous protest at the same derby 109 years earlier. In both cases the activists were removed by police officers and were arrested.

On 8 August 2022, the protesters stormed the Royal Society for the Prevention of Cruelty to Animals, and occupied the national headquarters. They refused to leave the building, blocking the front doors and hosting impromptu workshops until the RSPCA agreed to declare its support for transitioning to a fully plant-based food system.

In June 2022, a group of protesters stormed Harrods and another store in London. They took cartons of milk and emptied them in the stores.

In early September 2022, Animal Rebellion declared it would disrupt dairy supplies during September. On 3 September, activists blocked access to milk at supermarkets in four cities. On 4 September, activists disrupted fresh milk supplies at four Müller and Arla distribution centres. 

In mid October 2022, activists from Animal Rebellion held protests by pouring milk on the floor in various stores and supermarkets across Britain, including Harrods, Marks and Spencer, Waitrose and Fortnum & Mason.

In November 2022 Animal Rebellion members joined Just Stop Oil in a protest on the M25 motorway in the UK.

Also in November 2022, they occupied Gordon Ramsay's three-star Michelin restaurant in Chelsea, London.

References

External links
 

2020 protests
2019 protests
Direct action
Environmental organisations based in the United Kingdom
Extinction Rebellion
Veganism in the United Kingdom
Vegan organizations